Ochanthuruth is one of the villages in Vypin, an island in Ernakulam district, Kerala, India. It is on the southern part of Vypin.

Geography
It is located at Vypin Island of Ernakulam District.

Location
Ochanthuruth is 3 miles (5 km) north of Kochi.

Getting there
The commissioning of the Goshree bridges in 2004 has greatly improved the connectivity to Vypin island from the mainland. Regular ferry and boat services are also available between Vypin and Fort Kochi.

Tourism
The lighthouse at Puthuvype attracts a number of tourists. The lighthouse is open to tourists on all days from 3 pm to 5 pm. The famous Cherai Beach and Pallipuram Fort are near Ochanthuruth.

Churches 
 Cruz Milagres Church (Kurisingal Church)
Church of Our Lady of Perpetual Help (Vadakke Palli)

Notable People 

Joseph Attipetty, Archbishop of Verapoly
Eliswa Vakayil, first religious sister from Kerala and the foundress of Third Order of the Discalced Carmelite Congregation, the first indigenous Carmelite Congregation in India.

Bus stops

References

External links
 Visitors attraction in Kochi, refer Vypeen island

Villages in Ernakulam district